Heoclisis is a genus of cave-dwelling antlions, that is, insects in the family Myrmeleontidae.

The genus was first described by Longinos Navás in 1923.

Miller and Stange (2012) describe them as not being true cave-dwelling antlions, because  not all life stages are confined to caves.

Species
These species belong to the genus Heoclisis:
Heoclisis acuta (Kimmins, 1939)
Heoclisis angustipennis New, 1985	 
Heoclisis conspurcata (Gerstaecker, 1885)	 
Heoclisis fulva (Esben-Petersen, 1912)	 
Heoclisis fulvifusa (Kimmins, 1939)	 
Heoclisis fundata (Walker, 1853)	 
Heoclisis japonica (Hagen, 1866)	 
Heoclisis louiseae Banks, 1938	 
Heoclisis ramosa New, 1985	 
Heoclisis sinensis Navás, 1923	 
Heoclisis tillyardi (Kimmins, 1939)

References

External links
Heoclisis: images & occurrence data from GBIF

Myrmeleontidae
Taxa named by Longinos Navás
Taxa described in 1923